The 2006 NCAA Division I Field Hockey Championship was the 26th women's collegiate field hockey tournament organized by the National Collegiate Athletic Association, to determine the top college field hockey team in the United States. The Maryland Terrapins won their fifth championship, defeating the Wake Forest Demon Deacons in the final. The semifinals and championship were hosted by the Wake Forest University at Kentner Stadium in Winston-Salem, North Carolina.

Bracket

References 

2006
Field Hockey
2006 in women's field hockey
2006 in sports in North Carolina